Ballur is a village in Bagalkot district of Karnataka, which is submerged in backwater of River Krishna (almatti  Dam) India.

References

Villages in Dharwad district